Tipong also known as Tipong Colliery,  is a small Town in Margherita Tehsil in Tinsukia District of north-eastern state Assam, India. It is located around 4 km away from nearest town Lekhapani, 9 km from away Tirap Gaon and 12 km away from nearest town Ledo. Tipong is connected by National Highway 38 to Makum. National Highway 153 which connects Ledo to Indo-Myanmar border (Stillwell Road) across Pangsau Pass through Lekhapani.

Nearest Town and Villages 
 Jagun
 Lekhapani
 Tirap Gaon
 Ledo, Assam

References

External links
 Tour to Tipong, Assam

Cities and towns in Tinsukia district
Tinsukia